The Tripoli Bloc has been one of the political blocs present in the Lebanese Parliament. In 1961, the bloc had four members in the parliament. All members of the bloc are deputies from Tripoli (Lebanon). At the elections in June 2005, the bloc was part of the March 14 Alliance and the Rafik Hariri Martyr List that won the elections. It remained committed to the basic premises of the March 14 Alliance in 2008.

Members 
 Mohammad Safadi
 Qassem Abdulaziz
 Maurice Fadel

References

1960s establishments in Lebanon
Liberal parties in Lebanon
March 14 Alliance
Political parties established in the 1960s
Political parties with year of establishment missing

Parliamentary blocs of Lebanon